Giorgio Pasotti (born 22 June 1973) is an Italian actor and former martial arts athlete.

Life and career 
Born in Bergamo, Pasotti started performing martial arts at a very young age, practicing karate and kobudo and became European and World champion of wushu. He speaks five languages. Between 1994 and 1996 he lived in China, where, while studying at the Beijing Sport University, he made his film debut in American Shaolin and appeared in several other martial arts films.
  
Back in Italy, Pasotti continued his film career appearing in art films, blockbusters, television series and commercials. In 2005 he was appointed Shooting Star at the Berlin International Film Festival. The same year, he was nominated at David di Donatello for Best Actor for his performance in After Midnight.

Selected filmography 
 Treasure Hunt (1994)
 Drunken Master III (1994)
 Ecco fatto (1998)
 Little Teachers (1998)
 The Last Kiss (2001)
 After Midnight (2004)
 To Sleep Next To Her (2004)
 The Roses of the Desert (2006)
 Salty Air (2006)
 Baciami ancora (2010)
 Anita Garibaldi (2012)
 The Great Beauty (2013)
 Diary of a Well-to-do Maniac (2013)
 Sapore di te (2014)
 A Fairy-Tale Wedding (2014)
 Tulipani, Love, Honour and a Bicycle (2017)

References

External links 

Diary of a Well-to-do Maniac at Eurochannel

1973 births
Actors from Bergamo
Italian male stage actors
Italian male film actors
Italian male television actors
Living people